Ancient Chinese, either in English or in translation of the Chinese , may refer to:

 Old Chinese or Archaic Chinese, the ancient form of spoken Chinese
 Classical Chinese or Literary Chinese, the form now known as "Ancient Chinese" in China
 Middle Chinese, the form employed by the Tang poets and often known as "Ancient Chinese" in older English texts

See also
 Ancient China